The Peppermint Rainbow was an American sunshine pop group from Baltimore, Maryland.  They formed in 1967 under the name "New York Times" playing to local gigs in the mid-Atlantic states. They were signed to Decca Records in 1968 at the behest of talent agent Alan White at Action Talents in NYC, who brought them to New York and showcased them for producer Paul Leka who saw them play and sing both a medley of the Mamas and the Papas and the 5th Dimension tunes.  They changed their name to "The Peppermint Rainbow" following their signing by Leka.

Under Decca the group was produced by Paul Leka; their first single "Walking in Different Circles" b/w "Pink Lemonade" did not chart. Their second single, "Will You Be Staying After Sunday", reached No. 4 on KHJ on April 2, 1969. Nationally, it spent 14 weeks on the U.S. Billboard Hot 100, and reached No. 32 on May 3, 1969, selling over one million copies and receiving a gold disc. The song also reached No. 21 on the Cash Box Top 100, and in Canada it peaked at No. 19.

The group made an appearance on the 2 May 1969 episode of The Generation Gap television quiz show from which the promotional clip of the song originates.  As with most similar clips of the period, the performance is a lip-and-finger sync, noted mainly by the fact that none of the electric instruments are plugged in.

Their third release, "Don't Wake Me Up in the Morning, Michael", spent nine weeks on the Billboard Hot 100, and reached No. 54 on July 26, 1969, while reaching No. 21 on Billboards Easy Listening chart.

Their LP, Will You Be Staying After Sunday, barely missed the Top 100 of Billboards albums chart, peaking at No. 106.

After recording three more post-album singles which also did not chart, including "Walking in Different Circles" (which had some minor airplay in the UK), and "You're the Sound of Love", the band split up in 1970, after which the chorus of the latter tune would come to be re-arranged and re-recorded in the early 1970s as "We're the Sound of Love" and used as an ID jingle for a number of radio stations featuring love songs prominently on their playlist.

Singles discography
"Will You Be Staying After Sunday"

"Don't Wake Me Up in the Morning, Michael"

Members
Bonnie Lamdin – vocals
Patty Lamdin – vocals
Doug Lewis – guitar
Anton Corey – percussion
Skip Harris (deceased) – bass

References

American pop music groups
Decca Records artists
Musical groups from Baltimore
Sunshine pop